Kun Suomi putos puusta, (Finnish for "When Finland Fell Out Of the Tree") also known as Kun Suomi putos puusta: ääniä vapaan pudotuksen aikakaudelta, and is Ismo Alanko’s debut solo album. Released in 1990, it was originally commissioned for Helsingin Juhlaviikot (Helsinki Festival Week), when Alanko was still a member of the band Sielun Veljet (The Soul Brothers). The album's musical direction differed significantly from trademark Sielun Veljet material by exploiting a more acoustic and minimalist production style interspersed with foley-style atmospheric sound effects as typically used in film production. The album went on to sell over 30,000 copies in Finland and was certified gold in 1999.

Track listing 
All songs written by Ismo Alanko.
 "Kun Suomi putos puusta" – 4:21
 "Rakas, rämä elämä" – 3:06
 "Työ" – 1:14
 "Masentunut ameeba" – 4:57
 "Valheita ja onnenpekkoja" – 4:01
 "Alumiinikuu" – 3:14
 "Meidän isä" – 6:40
 "Hetki hautausmaalla" – 4:26
 "Tuupovaara-Helsinki" – 3:40

Personnel 
 Ismo Alanko: vocals, guitar, piano, keyboards, percussion, tools, breathing
 Ahti Marja-Aho: bass, piano, violin, maracas, mandolin, harmonium, zither, backing vocals, tools
 Riku Mattila: guitar, maracas, tools
 Keimo Hirvonen: drums
 Kari Lindstedt: cello
 Mauri Pietikäinen: viola
 Heikki Hämäläinen: violin
 Seppo Rautasuo: violin
 Jari Hongisto: trombone
 Matti Riikonen: trumpet
 Jouni Kannisto: saxophone
 Pentti Lahti: saxophone
 Jussi Harju: tuba
 Raoul Björkenheim: bass drum
 Susanna Tollet: vocals
 Satu Kaarisola-Kulo: vocals
 Nina Fågelberg: vocals
 Jari Hyttinen: backing vocals
 Ilkka Alanko: backing vocals
 Pekka Karjalainen: effects

References 

1990 debut albums
Ismo Alanko albums